Fucheng County is a county in Hengshui, Hebei province, China.

Administrative Divisions
Towns:
Fucheng, Gucheng, Matou, Xiakou, Cuijiamiao

Townships:
Manhe Township, Jianqiao Township, Jiangfang Township, Dabai Township, Wangji Township

Climate

References

External links

 
County-level divisions of Hebei
Hengshui